Origins of Life and Evolution of Biospheres is a peer-reviewed scientific journal established in 1968 covering astrobiology and origins of life research. It is the official journal of the International Society for the Study of the Origin of Life. The journal's scope includes research on the origin, evolution, distribution, and future of life on Earth and beyond. Some examples of areas of interest are: prebiotic chemistry and the nature of Earth's early environment, self-replicating and self-organizing systems, the RNA world hypothesis and of other possible precursor systems, and the problem of the origin of the genetic code. According to the Journal Citation Reports, the journal has a 2016 impact factor of 1.000.

Abstracting and indexing
The journal is abstracted and indexed in the following databases:

References

External links
 
Springer Science+Business Media academic journals
Evolutionary biology journals
Evolution of the biosphere
Bimonthly journals
Publications established in 1968
English-language journals